Shiloh Township is one of fifteen townships in Edgar County, Illinois, USA.  As of the 2010 census, its population was 162 and it contained 89 housing units.  Shiloh Township was formed from Young America and Edgar townships.

Geography

Cities, towns, villages
 Hume (south edge)

Extinct towns
 Garland
 Hughes
 Melwood

Cemeteries
The township contains Payne Cemetery.

Major highways
  US Route 36
  Illinois Route 49

Demographics

School districts
 Paris Community Unit School District 4
 Shiloh Community Unit School District 1

Political districts
 Illinois' 15th congressional district
 State House District 110
 State Senate District 55

References
 
 United States Census Bureau 2007 TIGER/Line Shapefiles
 United States National Atlas

External links
 City-Data.com
 Illinois State Archives
 Edgar County Official Site

Townships in Edgar County, Illinois
Townships in Illinois